2019 U.S. Open may refer to:

2019 U.S. Open (golf), a major golf tournament
2019 US Open (tennis), a grand slam tennis event
2019 U.S. Open (badminton)
2019 U.S. Open Cup, a soccer tournament